Eksjö Municipality (Eksjö kommun) is a municipality in Jönköping County, southern Sweden, where the town Eksjö is seat.

The present municipality was created in 1971 when the former City of Eksjö was amalgamated with three neighboring municipalities.

Localities
There are 6 urban areas (also called a Tätort or locality) in Eksjö Municipality.

In the table the localities are listed according to the size of the population as of December 31, 2005. The municipal seat is in bold characters.

Natives
Albert Engström (1869-1940) was an author, poet and drawer and subsequently member of the Swedish Academy, who grew up in a small village outside of the city Eksjö.

Sister cities
Marstal, in Denmark
Barlinek, in Poland
(See sister city.)

References
Statistics Sweden

External links

Official Eksjö Municipality website

 
Municipalities of Jönköping County